Anders Christensen (born 21 October 1985) is a Danish handball player, currently playing for Danish Handball League side FCK Håndbold, with whom he won the Danish Championship in 2008.

He has made two appearances for the Danish national handball team.

External links
 
 player info

1985 births
Living people
Danish male handball players